Chal Gonbad (also Romanized as Chāl Gonbad; also known as Chāleh Gonbad and Chāleh Gunbad) is a village in Neyzar Rural District, Salafchegan District, Qom County, Qom Province, Iran. At the 2006 census, its population was 238, in 66 families.

References 

Populated places in Qom Province